Iberian languages is a generic term for the languages currently or formerly spoken in the Iberian Peninsula.

Historic languages

Pre-Roman languages 

The following languages were spoken in the Iberian Peninsula before the Roman occupation and the spread of the Latin language.
 Aquitanian (probably closely related to or the same as Proto-Basque)
 Proto-Basque
 Iberian
 Tartessian
 Indo-European languages
 Celtic languages
 Celtiberian
 Gallaecian
 Lusitanian (disputed: either Italic, Celtic, Para-Celtic or other Indo-European)
 Sorothaptic
 Hellenic
 Ancient Greek
Afro-Asiatic languages
 Semitic languages
 Phoenician
 Punic

Medieval languages 
The following languages were spoken in the Iberian Peninsula in medieval times, following the fall of the Western Roman Empire.
 Medieval Basque
 Indo-European languages
 Germanic languages
 Buri
 Gothic
 Suebian
 Vandalic
Italic languages
 Latin
 Astur-Leonese
 Galician-Portuguese (Old Portuguese)
 Old Provençal (Old Occitan)
 Old Castilian (Old Spanish)
 Mozarabic
 Navarro-Aragonese
 Celtic languages
 Brittonic
 Indo-Iranian languages
 Scythian
 Alanic
 Romani
Afro-Asiatic languages
 Berber languages
Semitic languages
 Arabic languages
 Classical Arabic
 Andalusian Arabic
 Jewish languages
 Medieval Hebrew (based on Biblical Hebrew)
 Sephardi Hebrew
 Judaeo-Romance languages (also classified as Italic/Latin languages)
 Judaeo-Aragonese
 Judaeo-Catalan
 Judaeo-Portuguese
 Judaeo-Spanish

Modern languages 
The following indigenous languages are currently spoken in the Iberian Peninsula.

By linguistic group

 Basque (isolate)
Batua
Biscayan
Gipuzkoan
Upper Navarrese
Lower Navarrese
Lapurdian
Souletin
 Indo-European languages
 Italic languages
 Romance languages
 Aragonese
 Astur-Leonese
 Asturian
 Cantabrian (co-dialect with Spanish)
 Leonese
 Mirandese
 Extremaduran (co-dialect with Spanish)
 Catalan
Eastern Catalan
Northern Catalan
Central Catalan
Western Catalan
North-Western Catalan
Valencian
Ribagorçan (co-dialect with Aragonese)
Benasquese (co-dialect with Aragonese and Gascon Occitan)
 French
Portugalician
 Galician
 Eonavian 
 Fala
 Portuguese
 Portuguese dialects
 Spanish (or Castilian)
Spanish dialects and varieties
Germanic languages
 Anglic
English (Gibraltar)
Mixed languages
 Caló (Ibero-Romance Romani)
Spanish Caló
Catalan Caló
Portuguese Calão
Erromintxela (Basque Romani)
 Barranquenho
 Llanito
Sign languages
Spanish Sign Language
Catalan/Valencian Sign Language
Portuguese Sign Language
French Sign Language

By country
 Andorra:
Catalan (official recognition)
Spanish
French
Portuguese
 France (Pyrénées-Orientales):
French (official recognition)
French Sign Language (official recognition)
Catalan (official recognition)
Occitan (not in the Iberian Peninsula, official recognition)
 Gibraltar (UK dependency):
English (official recognition)
British Sign Language
Spanish
Llanito
 Portugal:
Portuguese (official recognition)
Barranquenho (spoken in the town of Barrancos, near Portuguese–Spanish border; recognized and protected)
Portuguese Sign Language (official recognition)
Mirandese (only spoken in a small eastern area of the Norte region, near Portuguese-Spanish border; official recognition)
 Spain:
Spanish (also called Castilian, official recognition)
Spanish Sign Language (official recognition)
Catalan (official recognition)
Valencian (official recognition)
Catalan Sign Language (official recognition)
Valencian Sign Language (official recognition)
Galician (official recognition) and Fala
 Eonavian (also called Galician-asturian, official recognition) 
Basque (official recognition)
Aragonese (official recognition)
Asturian (also called Bable, official recognition)
Cantabrian
Leonese (official recognition)
Extremaduran
Occitan (not in the Iberian Peninsula, locally called Aranese, official recognition)
Moroccan Arabic (not in the Iberian Peninsula)
Riffian Berber (not in the Iberian Peninsula)

Usage of co-official languages in Spain

See also 
 Languages of Andorra
 Languages of Spain
 Languages of France
 Languages of Portugal
 Languages of Gibraltar
 Iberian Romance languages
Pre-Roman peoples of the Iberian Peninsula
 Balearic Catalan

External links
Detailed map of the Pre-Roman Peoples of Iberia (around 200 BC)
Detailed linguistic map of the Iberian Peninsula
Swadesh lists of Iberian languages basic words (from Wiktionary's Swadesh list appendix)

References

Languages of Europe
Paleohispanic languages
Languages of Spain
Languages of Portugal
Extinct languages of Europe